The 2018–19 Columbia Lions women's basketball team represented Columbia University during the 2018–19 NCAA Division I women's basketball season. The Lions, led by third-year head coach Megan Griffith, played their home games at Levien Gymnasium and were members of the Ivy League. They finished the season 8–19, 4–10 in Ivy League play to finish in seventh place. They failed to qualify for the Ivy women's tournament.

Previous season
They finished the season 8–21, 2–12 in Ivy League play to finish in last place. They failed to qualify for the Ivy women's tournament.

Roster

Schedule

|-
!colspan=9 style=| Non-conference regular season

|-
!colspan=9 style=| Ivy League regular season

See also
 2018–19 Columbia Lions men's basketball team

References

Columbia Lions women's basketball seasons
Columbia
Columbia
Columbia